Pagurus samuelis, the blueband hermit crab, is a species of hermit crab from the west coast of North America, and the most common hermit crab in California. It is a small species, with distinctive blue bands on its legs. It prefers to live in the shell of the black turban snail, and is a nocturnal scavenger of algae and carrion.

Description
The base colour of the exoskeleton is brown or green, but the antennae are red, and adults have bright blue bands near the tips of their legs. In smaller individuals, the bands may be white. The legs and carapace are covered in setae, and the rostrum at the front of the carapace is triangular.

Distribution
Pagurus samuelis is found from Alaska to Punta Eugenia in Baja California, Mexico. It was formerly thought to also occur in Japan, but the Japanese specimens which were formerly assigned to this species are now recognised as Pagurus filholi.

Ecology and life cycle
Pagurus samuelis prefers to use the discarded shell of the black turban snail, Tegula funebralis. They are chiefly nocturnal scavengers that feed on algae, especially the giant kelp Macrocystis pyrifera, and detritus. In a laboratory setting, P. samuelis can survive on a diet of Pelvetia canaliculata. Predators of P. samuelis include fishes such as the pile perch (Rhacochilus vacca), California sheephead (Semicossyphus pulcher) and the spotted kelpfish, Gibbonsia elegans.

In the breeding season, males carry females on their backs, sometimes for more than a day. Eggs are produced from May to July, and are carried on the female's abdomen, inside the shell.

See also
Pagurus hirsutiusculus

References

External links

Hermit crabs
Crustaceans of the eastern Pacific Ocean
Crustaceans described in 1857